Ndumbe is a given name. It may refer to the following people:
Ndumbe Lobe Bell (1839–1897) a leader of the Duala people in Southern Cameroon 
Ndumbe Eyoh (1949–2006), a Cameroonian theatre director, critic, and playwright
Manga Ndumbe Bell (1851–1908), a leader of the Duala people of southern Cameroon

African given names